[[|thumb]]

Wanjiru Kamau-Rutenberg is an Executive in Residence at Schmidt Futures. Before that she was Director of African Women in Agricultural Research and Development (AWARD). Wanjiru is also the Founder and past Executive Director of Akili Dada, a leadership incubator for African girls and young women and a former Assistant Professor of Politics at the University of San Francisco.

Education
Kamau-Rutenberg earned a Ph.D in Political Science from the University of Minnesota, Minneapolis,  where she concentrated on International Relations, Gender Studies & African History.  Her 2008 dissertation on the Impact of Ethnic Politics on Women’s Rights legislation during Kenya’s Democratic Transition theorised about the intersection of gender, (re)production of ethnic identities and democratisation processes in emerging economies.  Her essay using a gender lens to explore forced circumcision of men during Kenya's 2007-08 Post Election ethnic violence was one of the first of its kind to use African men's experiences of political violence as a point of departure to theorise the intersection of gender and politics and was published in the Oxford University Transitional Justice Research Working Paper Series.

She was also awarded a Doctorate of Humane Letters (Honoris Causa) by Whitman College, Washington.  This Honorary Doctorate recognised her scholarly work and activism towards gender equality especially in Africa. She delivered the commencement speech to the graduating class of 2017 as part of the award ceremony.

Kamau-Rutenberg also holds a Master of Arts degree in Political Science from the University of Minnesota, Minneapolis awarded in 2005, and a Bachelor of Arts in Politics from Whitman College, Walla Walla, Washington awarded in 2001.

Career
In 2005, Kamau-Rutenberg established Akili Dada, a leadership incubator for girls and young women based in Nairobi, Kenya to address the underrepresentation of women in leadership positions in Africa.

Kamau-Rutenberg also served as an Assistant Professor at University of San Francisco, San Francisco, California, from August 2008 to March 2014.  During her career in academia she focused on the politics of International Aid and Development, Politics of Global Philanthropy, African Politics, International Relations, Politics of Race and Ethnic Identity.

Kamau-Rutenberg also served as a Lecturer in International Relations at  Hekima University College, a Constituent College of the Catholic University of Eastern Africa, Nairobi, Kenya, from August 2013 to January 2014.

In March 2014 she was appointed the director of African Women in Agricultural Research and Development (AWARD)] which is hosted by the World Agroforestry Centre (ICRAF) headquartered in Nairobi, Kenya. AWARD invests in agricultural scientists, research institutions, and agribusinesses, strengthening their ability to deliver gender-responsive agricultural innovation for inclusive, agriculture-driven prosperity across Africa. In 2017 AWARD announced the One Planet Fellowships, a $20M, 5 year initiative to invest in the careers of 600 scientists working towards research to help African smallholder farmers adapt towards a changing climate.

Board Roles
Wanjiru has, and continues to serve in numerous Boards. In 2021 she was appointed to Board of Landesa, the world's largest land rights organization, and the Board of the Syngenta Foundation.  She also serves on the Selection Committee of the Africa Food Prize, the Board of the Wangari Maathai Foundation, and the President's Advisory Board of Whitman College.

She also sits on the Councils of the African Climate Foundation and The Center for Development Research at the University of Bonn.  She is a member of the Malabo Montpellier Panel, a high-level panel of independent experts that supports African governments and civil society identify and implement policies that enhance agriculture, food and nutrition security across the continent.  She also serves on the Board of Twaweza,. East Africa’s largest public and policy engagement platform.

Awards and honors
 2003: MacArthur Doctoral Fellow], Interdisciplinary Program on Global Change, Sustainability and Justice, Doctoral Research Fellowship, University of Minnesota
 2010: Winner, Marketplace of Ideas, United Nations Alliance of Civilizations, Rio de Janeiro, Brazil
2011: Thomas I. Yamashita Prize, Center for the Study of Social Change, University of California at Berkeley
2012: 100 Most Influential Africans, New African Magazine
2012: Champion of Democracy] in East Africa, Ford Foundation
2012: White House Champion of Change,  United States White House and the United States Department of State
 2013: Africa's Most Influential Women in Business and Government, Winner, Civil Society category, Nairobi.
2014: Top 40 women under age 40, Business Daily, Nairobi, Kenya.
 2016: Africa's Most Influential Women, New African Magazine, London, U.K
2017: Doctor of Humane Letters (Honoris Causa), Whitman College, WA USA
 2018: Archbishop Desmond Tutu Leadership Fellow, African Leadership Institute, Oxford University, & Cape Town, South Africa
2018: 20 Faces of Science, Africa Science Week, Kenya
2021: 100 Most Influential African Women, Avance Media
2021: 27 Inspiring Women Reshaping the Food System 
2021: 100 Most Influential Women in Gender Policy, Apolitical

Bibliography

Book and journal contributions

Op-eds

References

21st-century Kenyan women scientists
21st-century Kenyan scientists
Living people
1978 births
Kenyan political scientists
University of Minnesota College of Liberal Arts alumni
Whitman College alumni
Women political scientists